Jesus Freak is a 2003 American micro-budget drama directed by Morgan Nichols. It stars Laura Lee Bahr, Regan Forman, Pete Kuzov, and Oded Gross, and tells the story of a teenage girl who, while struggling to find her identity in her small-minded town, brings home a man who is either her savior, a migrant Mexican, or both. The film was shot on location in Portales, New Mexico, where screenwriter and star Laura Lee Bahr grew up.

Cast
Laura Lee Bahr as Lily
Regan Forman as Christy
Pete Kuzov as John
Oded Gross as Tom
Josh Kantor as Jesus
Robin Mullins as Lily's Mother

Awards, honors, and festivals
 Jesus Freak won the Best Southwest Award at the Santa Fe Film Festival.
 Jesus Freak was a "sleeper hit" at the first Tallgrass Film Festival.

Reception
Susanna Ulrich of the Los Angeles Film Festival said of Jesus Freak: "By turns wistful, poignant and offbeat, the debut feature from director Morgan Nichols ultimately captures the confusion of adolescence with a rare, touching grace." Variety said "There's a Claire Danes quality to Bahr's gentle, nuanced performance that solidly anchors the film."

References

External links

The original trailer for Jesus Freak

2000s English-language films